The Spirit of Ecstasy is the bonnet ornament sculpture on Rolls-Royce cars. It is in the form of a woman leaning forwards with her arms outstretched behind and above her. Billowing cloth runs from her arms to her back, resembling wings.

History

The Whisper, precursor to the Spirit of Ecstasy 
The first Rolls-Royce motorcars did not feature radiator mascots; they simply carried the Rolls-Royce emblem. When John, 2nd Baron Montagu commissioned his friend, sculptor Charles Robinson Sykes, who worked in London under the nobleman's patronage, to sculpt a personal mascot for the bonnet of his 1909 Rolls-Royce Silver Ghost, Sykes chose Eleanor Velasco Thornton as his model. Sykes originally crafted a figurine of her in fluttering robes, having placed one forefinger against her lips – to symbolize the secret of the love affair between Thornton and Montagu. The figurine was consequently named The Whisper and is on display at the National Motor Museum in Beaulieu along with other Spirit of Ecstasy figurines.

Only three or four castings were ever made, and only two are believed to have survived.

Modern ornament

The Spirit of Ecstasy, also called Eleanor, Silver Lady, or Flying Lady, was designed by Sykes, a graduate of London's Royal College of Art, and carries with it a story about secret passion between Montagu, second Baron Montagu of Beaulieu after 1905, a pioneer of the automobile movement, and editor of The Car Illustrated magazine from 1902, and the model for the emblem, Eleanor Velasco Thornton.

Eleanor (also known as Thorn) was the secretary of John Walter, who fell in love with her in 1902 when she worked for him on the aforesaid motoring magazine. Their secret love was to remain hidden, limited to their circle of friends, for more than a decade. The reason for the secrecy was Eleanor's impoverished social and economic status, which was an obstacle to their love. On the other hand, Montagu had been married to Lady Cecil Victoria Constance Kerr since 1889.

By 1910 personal mascots had become the fashion of the day. Rolls-Royce were concerned to note that some owners were affixing "inappropriate" ornaments to their cars. Claude Johnson, then managing director of Rolls-Royce Motor Cars, was asked to commission a more dignified and graceful mascot.

He turned to Sykes to produce a mascot which would adorn all future Rolls-Royce cars and become generic to the marque, with the specifications that it should convey "the spirit of the Rolls-Royce, namely, speed with silence, absence of vibration, the mysterious harnessing of great energy and a beautiful living organism of superb grace..."

Sykes' brief from Claude Johnson had been to evoke the spirit of mythical beauty, Nike, whose graceful image was admired in The Louvre, but Sykes was not impressed. He felt that a more feminine representation might be apt.

It was again Miss Thornton whom he had in mind. Sykes chose to modify The Whisper into a version similar to today's Spirit of Ecstasy. He called this first model The Spirit of Speed. Later, Charles Sykes called it "A graceful little goddess, the Spirit of Ecstasy, who has selected road travel as her supreme delight and alighted on the prow of a Rolls-Royce motor car to revel in the freshness of the air and the musical sound of her fluttering draperies."

Claude Johnson devised the description of the Spirit of Ecstasy, he described how Sykes had sought to convey the image of "the spirit of ecstasy, who has selected road travel as her supreme delight...... she is expressing her keen enjoyment, with her arms outstretched and her sight fixed upon the distance."

Royce was ill during the commissioning of the flying lady. He did not believe the figurine enhanced the cars, asserting that it impaired the driver's view, and was rarely seen driving one of his company's vehicles adorned with the mascot.

In February 1911 Sykes presented to Rolls-Royce the Spirit of Ecstasy, which was easily recognisable as being a variation on the theme of The Whisper. The similarity was hardly coincidental because the model for both had been Miss Thornton. The sculptor's signature appeared on the plinth and were either signed "Charles Sykes, February 1911" or "Feb 6, 1911" or "6.2.11". Even after Rolls-Royce took over the casting of the figures in 1948 each Spirit of Ecstasy continued to receive this inscription until 1951.

The Spirit of Ecstasy was also manufactured by the British firm Louis Lejeune Ltd. for a number of years.

Eleanor died on 30 December 1915 when the SS Persia was torpedoed by a U-boat south of Crete. She had been accompanying Lord Montagu who had been directed to assume a command in India. He was thought to have been killed too, but survived and was saved after several days adrift in a life raft.

Alterations
Royce made sure it was officially listed as an optional extra, but in practice it was fitted to almost all cars after that year, becoming a standard fitting in the early 1920s. It was silver plated from 1911 until 1914 when the mascot was made with nickel or chrome alloy to dissuade theft. The only departure from this came in Paris at the competition for the most apposite mascot of 1920, where a gold-plated version won first place. Gold-plated versions were subsequently available at additional cost. The design of the mascot has had eleven main variations in its life. Lowered height of coachwork forced subsequent reductions in the mascot size. Consequently, several alterations in the original design were made.

Kneeling version (1934–1939 and 1946–1956)

Sykes was once again commissioned by Rolls-Royce in the 1930s to make a lower version of the mascot to suit the needs of the new sports saloons by providing their drivers with a clearer view of the road ahead.

The kneeling lady mascot was unveiled on 26 January 1934 and was as undeniably a reflection of Eleanor as it was a symbol of the Rolls-Royce. It also bore on the plinth the inscription "C. Sykes, 26.1.34", the date when the first piece was finished. This version was, however, discontinued after the Silver Dawn, Phantom IV and Silver Wraith models, in favour of a smaller version of the original standing mascot, and so it remains to date. The last Phantom IV delivered and the final 4 or 5 years of the Silver Wraith carried this standing version.

2003-2022
There is a button within the vehicle which can raise/lower the emblem when pressed. She can be made from highly polished stainless steel, stainless with 24-carat gold plating, or from illuminated frosted crystal – the latter two being optional extras. Aftermarket customized versions are also available, including those covered in a matte black paint or studded in diamonds. The company created one as a Fabergé Egg.

Spectre redesign 
A new design was specially made for the all-new-electric Spectre, after it was first registered as intellectual property, in 1911. The figurine has been remodelled with a lower, more dynamic stance that brings her much closer to the original drawings made in the early years of the 20th century. The new version created for the Spectre will appear on all future models.

The new Spirit of Ecstasy stands 82.73mm tall, compared to her predecessor's 100.01mm. Her robes have been subtly reshaped to make them more aerodynamic and realistic.

The figurine is now braced for the wind, one leg forward, body tucked low, eyes focused eagerly ahead, "a true goddess of speed". Her new shape has been digitally sculpted, adding an authentically contemporary aura to her dynamism and commanding presence, including elegant facial features and expression, combining focus and serenity. She has, previously, stood with her feet together, legs straight and tilting at the waist.

Earliest prototypes showed a drag coefficient of just 0.26, making it the most aerodynamic Rolls-Royce ever created. The drag coefficient is expected to improve during the product's testing protocols undertaken in 2022. The Rolls-Royce Spectre is expected to debut in 2023.

Popular culture
In Serge Gainsbourg's 1971 concept album Histoire de Melody Nelson, the Spirit of Ecstasy features prominently in the opening song:
 In the music video to "The New Pollution" by Beck, the singer is seen driving a Rolls-Royce, with the Spirit of Ecstasy prominently featured and segueing into an actress replicating the famous pose with billowing robes.

References

External links
 Rolls-Royce Motor Cars Limited homepage
 Spirit of Ecstasy Press kit
 The Spirit of Ecstasy, darkforce
 Wings of desire: the secret love affair that inspired Rolls-Royce's flying lady – The Telegraph, 20 April 2008
 British Stainless Steel Association - The History of Stainless Steel 1913-1949

Personifications
Rolls-Royce
Figurines
Metal sculptures
Sculptures of women
Statues of fictional characters
Mascots introduced in 1911